Faliscan may refer to:

Falisci, an ancient Italic people
Faliscan language

Language and nationality disambiguation pages